The 1933 Murray State Thoroughbreds football team was an American football team that represented Murray State Teachers College—now known as Murray State University—as a member of the Southern Intercollegiate Athletic Association (SIAA) during the 1933 college football season. Led by second-year head coach Roy Stewart, the Thoroughbreds compiled an overall record of 9–0 with a mark of 7–0 in conference play, winning the SIAA title.

Schedule

References

Murray State
Murray State Racers football seasons
College football undefeated seasons
Murray State Thoroughbreds football